The Story of Frozen: Making a Disney Animated Classic is a television special that aired September 2, 2014, on ABC. The program details the creation process of Walt Disney Animation Studios' 2013 3D computer-animated musical film Frozen, and the film's cultural impact.

Overview
On August 13, 2014, it was announced that the one-hour television special, titled The Story of Frozen: Making a Disney Animated Classic, would air September 2, 2014, on ABC. It features interviews with some of the cast and the creative team of the film; footage from Norway that inspired the look of Frozen; announcements of what is planned for the Frozen franchise; a preview of Anna, Elsa, and Kristoff's appearances in the fourth season of the TV series Once Upon a Time; and a sneak peek of Walt Disney Animation Studios' film Big Hero 6. The special also announced Frozen Fever, an animated short film serving as a sequel to Frozen, which was released alongside the live-action Walt Disney Pictures film Cinderella on March 13, 2015.

References

External links
 The Story of Frozen: Making a Disney Animated Classic at ABC
 

2014 television specials
Works about Frozen (franchise)